is a 1989 Japanese film directed by Tomio Kuriyama. It was released on 30 September 1989. It is the second film in the Tsuribaka Nisshi series.

1989 films
Films directed by Tomio Kuriyama
1980s Japanese-language films
 
Shochiku films
1980s Japanese films